The 2019–20 Taça de Angola was the 38th edition of the Taça de Angola, the second most important and the top knock-out football club competition in Angola following the Girabola.

The tournament was cancelled due to the COVID 19 pandemic.

Stadia and locations

Preliminary rounds

Round of 16

Quarter-finals

Semifinals

See also
 2019–20 Girabola
 2019–20 Angola Super Cup
 2019–20 CAF Confederation Cup

External links
 profile at girabola.com

References

Angola Cup
Cup
Angola